Bird Mountain is a peak of the Kittatinny Mountains in Sussex County, New Jersey, United States. It lies near the Appalachian Trail in the Delaware Water Gap National Recreation Area, and overlooks Quick's Pond to the east.

References

External links
National Park Service: Delaware Water Gap National Recreation Area

Kittatinny Mountains
Mountains of New Jersey
Mountains of Sussex County, New Jersey